Anwar Husnoo is a politician from Mauritius who is serving as Vice Prime Minister of Mauritius. He also served as Minister of Local Government and Disaster Risk Management.

References 

Vice Prime Ministers of Mauritius
Living people
Year of birth missing (living people)